Gerald "Jerry" Martin Ackerman OAL (August 21, 1928 – January 1, 2016) was an American art historian and educator. Ackerman was Professor of Art History Emeritus at Pomona College. He was a leading authority on the art of Jean-Léon Gérôme and Charles Bargue.

Career
Born in Alameda, but raised in Santa Cruz, Ackerman was born to Alois and Eva Sadler. Ackerman graduated from the University of California, Berkeley with a Bachelor of Arts in 1952, and then continued on to receive a Doctor of Philosophy from Princeton University in Art History in 1964. His doctoral dissertation was on the painter Gian Paolo Lomazzo, supervised by Rensselaer W. Lee.

In 1959, while studying at Princeton, Ackerman began his teaching career at Bryn Mawr College as a lecturer. Six years later, he was hired at Stanford University as Assistant Professor of Art History. In 1971, Ackerman was hired at Pomona College at the level of Associate Professor. Five years later, he became Professor and Department Chair, and spent the rest of his career at Pomona. Ackerman retired from teaching in 1989 and became Professor Emeritus. In 1994, he had a stint as Appleton Distinguished Professor at Florida State University.

In 2012, Ackerman was named Officer of the Ordre des Arts et des Lettres by the French government.

Personal life
In 1962, Ackerman met his long-time partner and husband, Leonard R. Simon. The couple remained together until Simon's death in 2014. Ackerman died two years later.

See also
List of Bryn Mawr College people
List of Florida State University people
List of gay, lesbian or bisexual people: A
List of members of the Ordre des Arts et des Lettres
List of people from Santa Cruz, California
List of Pomona College people
List of Princeton University people
List of Stanford University people
List of University of California, Berkeley alumni in arts and media

References

External links
Dictionary of Art Historians profile
Los Angeles Times obituary

1928 births
2016 deaths
People from Alameda, California
People from Santa Cruz, California
LGBT people from California
University of California, Berkeley alumni
Princeton University alumni
American art historians
Bryn Mawr College faculty
Stanford University faculty
Pomona College faculty
Florida State University faculty
Officiers of the Ordre des Arts et des Lettres